The Maria Mallaband Care Group (MMCG)  is an English company providing care for elderly and mentally impaired people. It was established in Leeds in 1996 by Phil Burgan, a former pharmacist, who remains CEO; it  was named after his grandmother. Its services include nursing, day care, respite and palliative care.

The group has 27 care homes located in the United Kingdom and the Channel Islands. The company is ranked 89th in the  Sunday Times Fast Track 100 in 2009.  and was listed as one of Britain's fastest growing private companies in 2010.

The overall enterprise also includes  Countrywide Care Homes, Maria Mallaband Care Solutions, and MMCG Living. Overall, there are 76 care homes, 3200 residents,  more than 4,000 staff, and  an annual turnover of £100 million.

Historically, MMCG provided care for adults with autism or challenging behaviour. In August 2014 that business was demerged into Autism UK Holdings Limited.

In 2012 a resident in a MMCG home was kept in a cold room, and was found to have a body core temperature of 25C when they died of hypothermia. In 2016 MMCG pleaded guilty to breaking heath and safety rules, and was fined £1.6million.

See also
Private healthcare in the United Kingdom

References

External links

Health care companies of England
Companies established in 1996
Nursing homes in the United Kingdom
1996 establishments in England
Companies based in Leeds